Agustín Calleri and Mariano Hood were the defending champions but only Hood competed that year with Lucas Arnold.

Arnold and Hood lost in the quarterfinals to Mariusz Fyrstenberg and Marcin Matkowski.

Juan Ignacio Chela and Gastón Gaudio won in the final 7–6(7–2), 7–6(7–3) against Nicolás Lapentti and Martín Rodríguez.

Seeds

Draw

References
 2004 BellSouth Open Doubles draw

Chile Open (tennis)
2004 ATP Tour